Balaka is a movie theater located in New Market, Dhaka, Bangladesh. Balaka Cineworld, one of the oldest movie theaters in the country, was closed on 20 March 2020 for COVID-19 epidemic, but reopened on 29 September 2022.

History

Balaka Cineworld was established by MA Hasan in Dacca, the capital of East Bengal on 27 August 1951, five years after the establishment of the Dominion of Pakistan. After Hasan's death in the 1970s, the movie theater was owned and operated by his heirs. In 1985, a branch theater of Balaka Cineworld, Balaka-2, was established. Balaka was first modernized in 2001. In 2015, the second Balaka was closed due to lack of customers. The digital tuning system was first introduced in the country at Balaka Cineworld. On 7 November 2019, after the death of Mohammad Hasan Ali Imam, managing director of Hasan Movies Limited, a conflict arose between his two wives and children over the ownership of the movie theater. In such a situation Mohammad Hossain, the son-in-law of the Imam's daughter, was given the responsibility of managing the movie theater. Balaka Cineworld closed on 20 March 2020 due to the COVID-19 pandemic. Balaka could not be opened due to monetary loss of  during the lockdown and legacy issues of the movie theater.

Features
The movie theater currently has 1011 seats. Four shows are held here daily.

References

Cinemas in Dhaka
1951 establishments in East Pakistan